A priority certificate is a document attesting that the entities named in such a certificate are the first to discover a phenomenon from nature, the first proponent of a theory, abstract idea, solution to a problem, proof of a theorem etc. A person who makes a new and useful discovery is entitled to receive such a priority certificate for that specific discovery. 

Private or public companies and organizations, such as universities, R&D institutions, trade shows and exhibitions are known to grant priority certificates to confer formal recognition upon the claimant(s).

See also
 Certification
 Copyright
 Invention
 List of scientific priority disputes
 Priority right
 Provisional application
 Scientific priority
 Stigler's law of eponymy

References

Scientific method
Discovery and invention controversies